Diarmuid Ryan (born 1999) is an Irish hurler who plays for Clare Senior Championship club Cratloe and at inter-county level with the Clare senior hurling team. He usually lines out as a left wing-forward.

He is the younger brother of former Clare hurler Conor Ryan.

Honours

Ardscoil Rís
Dr. Harty Cup (1): 2018

References

1999 births
Living people
Cratloe hurlers
Clare inter-county hurlers